Friedrich Harms (24 October 1819, in Kiel – 5 April 1880, in Berlin) was a German realist philosopher, much influenced by Fichte.

He studied philosophy at the University of Kiel as a pupil of Heinrich Moritz Chalybäus. In 1842 he obtained his habilitation for philosophy at Kiel, where he later became an associate professor (1848; a full professor in 1858). In 1867 he relocated to the University of Berlin as a professor of philosophy.

Works
 Prolegomena zur Philosophie (1852) – Prolegomena to philosophy.
 Abhandlungen zur systematischen Philosophie (1868) – Essays on systematic philosophy.
 Die Philosophie seit Kant (1876) – Philosophy since Immanuel Kant.
 Ueber die Lehre von Friedrich Heinrich Jacobi (1876) – On the teachings of Friedrich Heinrich Jacobi. 
 Geschichte der Logik (1881) – History of logic.
 Logik (1886) edited by Heinrich Wiese.
 Begriff, Formen und Grundlegung der Rechtsphilosophie (1889) edited by Heinrich Wiese.
 Naturphilosophie (1895) edited by Heinrich Wiese.
 Psychologie (1897) edited by Heinrich Wiese.

References 

19th-century German philosophers
1819 births
1880 deaths
University of Kiel alumni
Academic staff of the University of Kiel
Academic staff of the Humboldt University of Berlin
German male writers